Baahubali (styled in official material as Bāhubali) is an Indian media franchise created by V. Vijayendra Prasad and S. S. Rajamouli. The franchise started off with a two-part film series directed by Rajamouli. The films were produced in Tollywood, the centre of Telugu language films in India, and were filmed in both Telugu and Tamil languages simultaneously. The films were followed by an animated series, a graphic novel, and a trilogy of novels in English.

The films in the franchise were jointly produced on a budget of 430 crore ($65 million). The first part, subtitled The Beginning was released on 10 July 2015. The second part, subtitled The Conclusion, released on 28 April 2017. The first novel in the franchise, titled The Rise of Sivagami, was released on 7 March 2017. The animated series Baahubali: The Lost Legends premiered on 19 April 2017 on Amazon Prime Video and on Colors TV on 10 December 2017 with an episode titled "Legend Begins".

Feature films

Production

Development 

In February 2011, S. S. Rajamouli announced that his next film would star Telugu actor Prabhas. In January 2013, he announced that the working title was Baahubali, though it would later be finalised. P. M. Satheesh stated that much effort was taken to keep the recording free of anachronistic sounds of modern machinery. Prabhas, Rana and Anushka practiced sword fighting, while Prabhas and Rana learned horse riding. It was later decided to make it a two part film which would release by 2015. On why the film was split into two parts, Rajamouli said, "The story, about two warring brothers for a kingdom, is so big that one film is not enough.  We tried but we were losing some of the emotional quotient hence the second release after a gap of 10 months." Tamil lyricist Madhan Karky was selected to write the dialogues for the Tamil version. He said that his dialogues would be along the lines of yesteryear epic historical movies like Manohara (1954) and Nadodi Mannan (1958) and that they would be in chaste Tamil. The film's action sequences were choreographed by Peter Hein who stated that efforts were being made to keep the visuals as a period film. For a particular action sequence, Peter Hein had to handle around 2000 stuntmen and elephants. K. K. Senthil Kumar was selected to handle the film's cinematography. Director S.S.Rajamouli said that he was inspired from epic Mahabharata in making Baahubali. The story of Baahubali: The Beginning and Baahubali: The Conclusion is set in Mahishmati kingdom. 

Sodhe Matha sent legal notices to the film's producers in early January 2014 about the film's title Baahubali which is the name of a revered Arihant in Jainism, Bahubali, as they were afraid that the film would portray his story in a violent manner. Days later, Sobhu Yarlagadda defended the story of the film saying "The film has nothing to do with Gomatheswara or the Jain religion. The story is completely fictional written by Vijayendra Prasad and will remain so. 'Baahubali' refers to the amount of power the protagonist possesses." He also clarified that they haven't received the legal notice yet. In June 2015, Rajamouli remarked on the setting and backdrop of the film this way:"The movie is set in a completely fictitious world and period, and I decided that I would design my own weapons and costumes whichever way I liked. People will buy into the film depending on how I present it."The creators were accused of copying the format and the idea of the "making video" from The Amazing Videohivers, a 123 seconds video clip, created by an Australian firm, which specializes in providing video templates for internet marketing. The video, which uses Adobe After Effects CS5 having a customizable template, depicts how film makers can use the video template to market their products. Regarding the issue, Shobhu Yarlagadda clarified "We have commercially purchased the template used in that video. We have licensed it legally. Anyone can license that template and it is not copying. We felt that the template is ideal for our video and hence we paid for it." Baahubalis first poster was released in early May 2015. The poster, which showed an infant being lifted from a waterbody by a woman's hand, was criticised for its lack of originality; Deccan Chronicle noted its similarities to the poster of the 1998 American film Simon Birch, commenting, "The Baahubali poster shows a woman's hand raising an infant from a river; the Hollywood film's poster shows an infant being raised by two hands from water. The image seems to be the same with one difference, the Baahubali poster's baby is seen in typical Indian attire."

P. M. Satheesh was the sound designer of the film. Regarding his experience with the film, he said "Baahubali is one of the very few films in South where a lot of importance is being given to sound recording. We dropped the idea of shooting with sync sound since the dialogue delivery has to be modified accordingly. The sound design team embeds various types of microphones throughout the set to record the ambient sound, which will lend a natural feel to the film. It's necessary, because some of these sounds aren't available in the market. It's quite a challenge for everyone". Sabu Cyril was the production designer of the film. In an interview with The Times of India, he said "Every hour is a challenge on the sets of Baahubali. Period films are a huge responsibility as there is no room for mistakes. Everything was created from scratch : chairs, thrones, palaces, swords, armor and costumes." Foley Artiste Philipe Van Leer started working with the film's crew from 5 November 2014 till 14 November 2014 at Dame Blanche complex in Belgium. Rana stated that the film is about a war between two cousin brothers – Baahubali played by Prabhas and Bhallaladeva played by Rana – for the kingdom of Mahishmati.

 Casting 
Prabhas was cast as main lead of the film. Anushka Shetty was cast as the heroine of the film as she was also a part of Mirchi (2013). She starred in Rajamouli's Vikramarkudu, and coincidentally became the first heroine Rajamouli repeated in his films and thus made her schedules full for 2013 and 2014. Telugu actor Rana Daggubati was recruited as the antagonist of the film and coincidentally he was also a part of Rudhramadevi. Tamil actor Sathyaraj, who played Prabhas's father in Mirchi, signed the film.

Kannada actor Sudeep was picked for a small but important role in the film. He shot for four days in July 2013 for the film and had to fight with Sathyaraj in a stunt sequence choreographed by Peter Hein. In April 2013, Adivi Sesh was cast for a crucial role in the film as Rajamouli was impressed by his work in the Panjaa (2011). Actress Ramya Krishna was chosen to play the crucial role in the film as Rajamatha in August 2013. Actor Nassar was selected to play a supporting role. On 11 December 2013, a press release stated that Charandeep is selected for one of the negative characters in the film. On 20 December 2013 a press release stated that Tamannaah will be second heroine of the film which marks her first collaboration with Rajamouli and second collaboration with Prabhas. Meka Ramakrishna was picked for the head of kuntala guerilla rebels.

 Characters and looks 

Rana Daggubati was said to be playing the role of Prabhas' brother and he too underwent a lot of physical transformation for the role he was assigned to play in the film. He also underwent training in Martial arts under the supervision of a Vietnamese trainer, Tuan. Sathyaraj has a tonsured look for his role in the film. Sudeep said that he would play the role of a weapons trader Aslam Khan in this film. At the end of October 2013, Rana appeared at a fashion show with a beefed up body which, according to him, was a part of his look in the film. In mid-May 2014, reports emerged that Anushka would play a pregnant woman for a few sequences in the second part of the film. Both Prabhas and Rana maintained long hair for both films.

At the same time, Prabhas posted in his Facebook page that he underwent a minor shoulder surgery and would join the film's sets in a span of a month. On 1 June 2014, Prabhas and Rana's trainer Lakshman Reddy, said that Prabhas started his training 8 months before the commencement of shooting and after two years, both of them weighed nearly 100 kilos each. He also added that Prabhas has two attires with a heavy, bulky body for Baahubali's role and a lean physique for the second role. For his look, Prabhas met WWE superstars like The Undertaker in February 2014 and interacted with them about their daily regimen and workouts.

Prabhas had equipment costing  15 million( 15 million) shipped to his home, where he built a personal gym. His breakfast included 40 half boiled egg whites blended and added with protein powder. In mid-June 2014, regarding her role in the film, Tamannaah said that she would be playing the role of a warrior princess named Avanthika and her appearance in the film is completely different when compared to her past films. Before joining the film's shoot, Tamannaah did costume trials for the film which she confirmed in her micro-blogging page stating "I am very excited to get on to the set of Baahubali. I did some dress trials today and my look in this movie will be totally new. I have never been seen in such sort of a look till now. It will be a new role for me." Rajamouli called Tamannaah and her characterization as a "value addition" to the movie. She stated that she plays Avanthika, and had a special training and diet regime. The film introduced a new language called Kilikili.

 Filming 

The shooting of the film started at Rock Gardens in Kurnool from 6 July 2013. At the end of August 2013, the film's shoot continued at Ramoji Film City in Hyderabad where key scenes on the lead cast were shot. The second schedule of the film ended on 29 August 2013. A new schedule started at Hyderabad on 17 October 2013. At the end of October 2013, the maize field specifically cultivated at Ramoji Film City for filming of few crucial sequences was destroyed by rains just a week before the start of the planned shoot there. The film's shoot again continued in Kurnool in November 2013 but the schedule ended abruptly due to incessant rains. Despite taking required measures, the film's crew could not control the people and around 30 thousand people reached the spot. After they were pacified by Prabhas and Rana, Rajamouli stood on the center stage and asked all of them to scream Jai Baahubali in sync. The entire incident was captured by the sound department so that it can be used in the film's final cut to create the right ambient sound in some crucial scenes. After that, the film's unit traveled to Kerala for their next schedule. The Kerala schedule started on 14 November 2013.

Towards the end of November 2013, shooting was disrupted by incessant rains and since a portion of shoot was outdoor, the shoot was temporarily stalled. The shoot at Kerala completed on 4 December 2013 and include Athirappilly Falls. A set was erected in Ramoji film city to shoot war sequences involving around 2000 junior artists and almost all the principal cast from 23 December 2013 for which groundwork began in October 2013. There were reports that the farmers at Anajpur village close to Ramoji Film City tried to disrupt the film's shooting citing that they did not have the required permissions to shoot there which were denied by Rajamouli. The film's unit took a two-day break on the eve of New Year and the shoot of the sequence resumed from 3 January 2014. In mid-January 2014, a massive set was constructed there at Ramoji Film City resembling the city center of the kingdom in which the story unfolds. The film's unit took a break on account of Makar Sankranti and the shoot of war sequences resumed from 16 January 2014. On 18 January 2014, the film completed 100 working days of the film's shoot.

From 28 March 2014, key scenes of the film were shot at night-time at Ramoji Film City. On 5 April 2014, Rajamouli informed that the war schedule came to an end. The film's next schedule started on 20 April 2014 after a brief break. The film's unit took a small break at the end of May 2014 after shooting some scenes on Rana Daggubati and Anushka at Ramoji Film City. Later Rana took a break from Baahubali's shooting for a couple of months. At the end of May 2014, it was reported that Tamannaah would join the sets in June 2014 and would participate till December 2014. Sudeep returned to the film's sets on 7 June 2014 and participated in the shoot along with Sathyaraj at Golconda Fort to start a fresh schedule which ended on 10 June 2014. Rajamouli started re-shoot of some scenes which were originally scheduled for last year whose shoot were disrupted by heavy rains. Tamannaah joined the film's sets in Hyderabad on 23 June 2014. At the end of June 2014, the filming continued at Annapurna Studios in Hyderabad. Prabhas, Tamannaah, Anushka and Rana participated in the shooting and important scenes were shot. That schedule ended after four days. At the same time, it was reported that the film's unit would travel to Bulgaria to shoot the sequences in maize fields which were supposed to be shot in the field destroyed due to rains at Hyderabad in October 2013.

A romantic song featuring Prabhas and Tamannaah was shot in a specially erected set in Ramoji Film City in the third week of July 2014 which was choreographed by K. Sivasankar. The song was shot using ropes and trusses which are generally used in the action scenes and the film's director of photography K. K. Senthil Kumar stated that the song is shot with an innovative concept with rich visuals. After its completion, an action sequence was shot at Ramoji Film City under the supervision of Peter Hein. On 10 August 2014 the film was declared as the first Telugu film to have been shot for 200 days. A fresh schedule started at Mahabaleshwar on 26 August 2014. The cast and crew had to brave bad weather, including rain, fog and cold weather to complete the scenes. After nearly two weeks, the team wrapped up the schedule and the next schedule began at Ramoji Film City in Hyderabad from 12 September 2014. Sabu Cyril designed a 100 feet statue which was erected by Peter Hein in late September 2014. Filming continued at Hyderabad though the rest of the films shoots were halted because of the ongoing strike by Telugu Film Federation Employees as they employed the staff not belonging to the Federation.

A few action sequences were shot at Ramoji Film City till 30 November on Prabhas and Rana. During the film's shoot for a particular sequence, Tamannaah stood under an artificial tree designed by Sabu Cyril as a part of the set to which she was tied to make sure that she did not fly away because of the strong winds. In early December 2014, the film's unit shifted to Bulgaria for a 25-day schedule. It was reported to shift to Bulgaria from Hyderabad because of the ongoing Telugu Film Federation Employees' strike though the makers refuted those reports adding that the schedule was planned long ago. After three weeks of shoot, the film's unit returned to Hyderabad on 23 December 2014. The film's shoot later continued at Ramoji Film City and from 22 December 2014, thousand horses brought from Rajasthan were planned to be used for shooting. A special song Manohari was filmed in March 2015 featuring Nora Fatehi, Scarlett Mellish Wilson, Madhu Sneha along with Prabhas.

A completely new language, called Kiliki was created by the lyricist Madhan Karky which is spoken by the Kalakeya tribe.

MusicBaahubali (One Man with Strong Arms) is the soundtrack of ten volumes composed by M. M. Keeravani, for the two-part Baahubali film series. The film score album consists of 10 volumes, varying from five to eight tracks with a duration of nearly twenty minutes, as a combination of Baahubali: The Beginning and Baahubali 2: The Conclusion, which were released in January–March 2018, in YouTube and all other streaming platforms. The film score was appreciated by both audience and critics alike, contributing to the success of both films.Volume 1Volume 2Volume 3Volume 4Volume 5Volume 6Volume 7Volume 8Volume 9Volume 10'''

 Release and reception 

 In other media 

 Animated series 
An animated series named Baahubali: The Lost Legends created by Graphic India and Arka Mediaworks premiered on Amazon Prime Video India. The first episode premiered on 19 April 2017 and the other episodes started streaming from 19 May onwards with a new episode released every Friday. Colors TV acquired the television rights of the series and aired the series after it ended its original run on Amazon Prime.

 Print media 
A prequel novel to the films, titled The Rise of Sivagami, was released on 31 March 2017. It is the first of a proposed novel trilogy titled Baahubali – Before The Beginning.Chaturanga a prequel novel to the films, was released on 6 August 2020. It is the second of a proposed novel trilogy titled Baahubali – Before The Beginning. A graphic novel titled Baahubali: Battle of the Bold released in the same month, by Graphic India.

On 28 December 2020, the third and final book of the series "Queen of Mahishmathi" was released.

In July 2018, it was announced that Baahubali has been adapted into a Japanese manga comic by Akira Fukaya, author of the manga works Hakobiya Ken, Mitsurin Shounen and Tetsuo: The Bullet Man.

 Game 
A mobile game called Baahubali: The Game based on the franchise was released on 15 August 2017, India's independence day, by Moonfrog.

 Netflix series 

A Baahubali'' prequel co-directed by Rajamouli is under production.

Cast and characters
 
 This table shows characters that have appeared in one or more films in the series.
 An empty dark grey cell indicates that the character was not in the film, or that the character's presence in the film has yet to be announced.
A  indicates a role as a younger version of the character.
 An  indicates a role as an older version of the character.
 A  indicates an uncredited role.
 A  indicates a cameo role.
 A  indicates a voice-only role
 A  indicates a stills or photographs role.
 An  indicates an appearance through archival footage.

Crew

Chronological order 
Various products below are arranged in a chronological order i.e. the order in which the various stories take place one after another in time.

Notes

References

External links 
 

 
Indian film series
Indian fantasy action films
2010s masala films
Films released in separate parts
Indian action adventure films
Indian fantasy adventure films